Line 1 is the oldest rail service in Metrovalencia, in Valencia, Spain. This makes Line 1 the longest line of the Metrovalencia, almost two times longer than Line 2.

The 1 operates during the day, stopping at the most important stations between Bétera station and Castelló station, specially the ones in the metropolitan area. For most stops outside the metropolitan area, passengers must request stop before alighting. 

On July 3, 2006, an accident occurred  on this line, between Jesús and Plaça d'Espanya station. 43 people were killed.

References

External links

Railway lines in Spain
Railway lines opened in 1988
Metrovalencia
1988 establishments in Spain
Metre gauge railways in Spain
Rapid transit lines in Spain